The Royal Family Order of George V is an honour that was bestowed on female members of the British royal family by King George V.

Queen Elizabeth II was the last surviving recipient when she died on 8 September 2022.

Appearance
The order consists of a miniature of the king in naval uniform set in a crowned oval diamond frame and suspended from a pale blue ribbon. It was provided in four different sizes: the largest version was bestowed on the King's wife and mother, the next largest went to his daughter and daughters-in-law, his sisters and his aunts; a smaller version was given to his granddaughters and the smallest to a number of other female relations.

List of known recipients

Size 1: 
 Queen Mary, the King's wife
 Queen Alexandra, the King's mother

Size 2:
 Princess Mary, Princess Royal and Countess of Harewood, the King's daughter
Princess Louise, Princess Royal, the King's sister
Princess Victoria, the King's sister
Queen Maud of Norway, the King's sister
Princess Christian of Schleswig-Holstein, the King's paternal aunt
Princess Louise, Duchess of Argyll, the King's paternal aunt
Princess Henry of Battenberg, the King's paternal aunt
The Duchess of Connaught and Strathearn, the King's paternal aunt by marriage
 Marie, Duchess of Edinburgh, the King's paternal aunt by marriage
The Dowager Duchess of Albany, the King's paternal aunt by marriage
Queen Elizabeth The Queen Mother, the King's daughter-in-law
Princess Marina, Duchess of Kent, the King's daughter-in-law
 Princess Alice, Duchess of Gloucester, the King's daughter-in-law

Size 3:
 Elizabeth II, the King's granddaughter
Princess Margaret, Countess of Snowdon, the King's granddaughter

Size 4
Princess Alice, Countess of Athlone, the King's first cousin
Princess Arthur of Connaught, Duchess of Fife, the King's niece
Maud Carnegie, Countess of Southesk, the King's niece
Margaret Cambridge, Marchioness of Cambridge, the King's sister-in-law
Crown Princess Margaret of Sweden, the King's first cousin
Lady Patricia Ramsay, the King's first cousin

See also
 Royal Family Order of George IV
 Royal Order of Victoria and Albert
 Royal Family Order of Edward VII
 Royal Family Order of George VI
 Royal Family Order of Elizabeth II

References 

Royal family orders
Orders of chivalry of the United Kingdom
George V
1910 establishments in the United Kingdom
British royal family